Eagle Squad is a 1989 Philippine action film co-written and directed by Jose N. Carreon. The film stars Edu Manzano, Ricky Davao, Julio Diaz, Robin Padilla, George Estregan Jr., Monsour del Rosario, Nick Martel and Jinggoy Estrada.

The film is streaming online on YouTube.

Cast
 Edu Manzano as Edmund Morales
 Ricky Davao as Carding de Villa
 Julio Diaz as Jun Domingo
 Robin Padilla as Raymond Perez
 George Estregan Jr. as Jett Espino
 Monsour del Rosario as Mon Rivera
 Nick Martel as Noel Martin
 Jinggoy Estrada as Johnny Estrella
 Zandro Zamora as Capt. Zarraga
 Paquito Diaz as Sgt. David
 Robert Talabis as Lt. Torres
 Val Iglesias as Capt. Inciong
 Jaime Fabregas as Syndicate Boss
 Bomber Moran as Kabo Morgan
 Ernie Zarate as Gen. Santos
 Eddie Infante as Monsignor
 Ester Chavez as Jun's Mother
 Mimi Mercado as Jun's Wife
 Ramon D'Salva as Edmund's Father
 Alma Lerma as Edmund's Mother
 Augusto Victa as Johnny's Father
 Vic Varrion as Jett's Father
 Maylene Gonzales as Carding's Wife
 Alex Bolado as Sparrow Head
 Danny Labra as Sparrow Informer
 Caloy Salvador as Sparrow Hitman
 Freddie Papa as Police Informer
 Rene Hawkins as Johnny's Suspect
 Polly Cadsawan as Jun's Victim

References

External links

Full Movie on Viva Films

1989 films
1989 action films
Filipino-language films
Philippine action films
Viva Films films